The Fort Worth and Rio Grande Railway, chartered under the laws of Texas on June 1, 1885, was part of a plan conceived by Buckley Burton Paddock and other Fort Worth civic leaders to create a transcontinental route linking New York, Fort Worth, and the Pacific port of Topolobampo, which they believed would stimulate the growth and development of southwest Texas in general, and the economy of Fort Worth in particular.

With financial backing from the Vanderbilt railroad syndicate, construction of the FW&RG began at Fort Worth in November, 1886, but proceeded slowly with many changes of route, reaching Granbury ( away) a year later, Comanche in 1890, and Brownwood,  from Fort Worth, in 1891.

In 1901, the Frisco Railroad got control of the FW&RG, which it operated as an independent subsidiary, extending the line to Brady in 1903 and on to Menard in 1911. The Frisco entered bankruptcy in 1913 and made no further extensions of the FW&RG, which in most years failed to make a net profit.

On March 1, 1937, Frisco sold the FW&RG to the Atchison, Topeka and Santa Fe Railway for $1.5 million, giving the latter an entry into Fort Worth from the west. Santa Fe immediately leased the FW&RG to its Texas subsidiary, Gulf, Colorado and Santa Fe Railway, into which the FW&RG was merged on December 31, 1948. The FW&RG trackage was known as the Dublin Subdivision. On acquisition, Santa Fe improved the FW&RG track and began routing high volumes of freight over it, en route between the Dallas/Fort Worth area and California.

The GC&SF was merged into corporate parent Atchison, Topeka and Santa Fe Railway on August 1, 1965. The Brownwood-Brady segment had been abandoned in 1959, and the Brady-Menard segment was abandoned in 1972. South Orient sold the Cen-Tex line to the Fort Worth and Western Railroad in 1999.

See also

For another ultimately unsuccessful attempt to create a transcontinental route to Topolobampo, see:

Kansas City, Mexico and Orient Railway

Footnotes

References

External links
1926 map of Santa Fe lines in Texas, Oklahoma, and Louisiana The FW&RG line from Fort Worth to Brownwood, Brady, and Menard is indicated, though not marked as such.
1946 map of Santa Fe lines in Texas, Oklahoma, and Louisiana In this map, the former FW&RG is shown as part of the GC&SF.
Osborn, William. "East of Eden, West of Lometa: The Santa Fe Railroad and the Livestock Industry of the Edwards Plateau, 1885-1975," presentation to the 31st annual meeting of the Edwards Plateau Historical Association, 5 Oct. 2002, accessed 24 May 2013.

1885 establishments in Texas
1948 disestablishments in Texas
Railway companies established in 1885
Railway companies disestablished in 1948
American companies disestablished in 1948
American companies established in 1885
1901 mergers and acquisitions
1937 mergers and acquisitions
1948 mergers and acquisitions
St. Louis–San Francisco Railway
Atchison, Topeka and Santa Fe Railway
Defunct Texas railroads
Transportation in Fort Worth, Texas
History of Fort Worth, Texas
Former Class I railroads in the United States